Gunnapalle Agraharam is a village in Amalapuram Mandal, Dr. B.R. Ambedkar Konaseema district in the state of Andhra Pradesh in India.

Geography 

Demographics 
 India census, Gunnapalle Agraharam had a population of 1963, out of which 1011 were male and 952 were female. The population of children below 6 years of age was 11%. The literacy rate of the village was 81%.

References 

Villages in Amalapuram Mandal